Boat Quay is a historical quay in Singapore which is situated upstream from the mouth of the Singapore River on its southern bank. It spans from the shophouses near UOB Plaza, stretching along one bank of the Singapore River, all the way till Elgin Bridge.

It was the busiest part of the old Port of Singapore, handling three-quarters of all shipping business during the 1860s. Because the south of the river here resembles the belly of a carp, which according to Chinese belief is where wealth and prosperity lay, many shophouses were built, crowded into the area.

Though serving aquatic trade is no longer Boat Quay's primary role, the shophouses on it have been carefully conserved and now house various bars, pubs and restaurants. Therefore, Boat Quay's social-economic role in the city has shifted away from that of trade and maritime commerce, and now leans towards more of a role accommodated for tourism and aesthetics for the commercial zone of which encloses the Singapore River. It is the soft front to the cosmopolitan banking and financial sectors lying immediately behind it.

Boat Quay is also the name of the road along the quay, which has since been converted into a pedestrian mall.

History

During the 1800s, Boat Quay was used to transfer various goods onto cargo ships, such as porcelain, rubber and spices. Trading in Boat Quay reached a peak in the mid 1800s.

Adaptive re-use of the historic buildings 

The Singapore government cleaned-up the river in 1983 and moved the remaining shipping industry's lighters were moved to a new quay near Pasir Panjang. Therefore, the Boat Quay was deserted and unused from 1983 to 1989.

In 1986, the Urban Redevelopment Authority announced plans to preserve Boat Quay as part of a master plan for conserving the whole of the Singapore River and its environs.

On 7 July 1989, an area encompassing South Bridge Road, Circular Road, Lorong Telok and North Canal Road was gazetted. The two- and three-storey shophouses in that area, with their characteristic five-foot way beneath projecting upper floors, were preserved and transformed into new businesses. The shophouses and godowns along the river bank were restored in the 1990s and are now bustling shops, restaurants and bars.

When the area became a conservation area in 1989, redevelopment began and by 1993 all historic shophouses were under reconstruction. The Singapore Urban Redevelopment Authority issued stringent guidelines for the restoration but did not provide cash grants or tax relief for conservation projects but waived some of the development charges, car parking requirements and car park deficiency charges.

The historic shophouses could now easily be re-used for modern businesses, such as restaurants, cafes, bars and small shops. The interior of the buildings could be modified with the new use in mind, in some cases using new non-traditional interior ornamentation, materials, and colours. For instance, the interior of the Opera Cafe at No. 40 Boat Quay was modified to create an ambiance similar to an opera stage-set. The ground floor of the Lim Family Shophouse at No. 58 Boat Quay was converted into a Japanese restaurant. The upper floor is used as a weekend flat for the Lim family, who lived in the building since 1908. The architect Mok Wei Wei created more open space by demolishing some of the original partition walls, but kept and restored the original teak floors, paint colour on the window frames, wooden balcony doors, and tile roofs. The historic blackwood furniture and art pieces were also restored and re-used.

Multiple startup companies also rent offices around the Boat Quay and nearby Circular Road area.

Gallery

See also
Raffles Place
Singapore River
 List of restaurant districts and streets

Literature
National Heritage Board (2002), Singapore's 100 Historic Places, Archipelago Press, 
Victor R Savage, Brenda S A Yeoh (2003), Toponymics – A Study of Singapore Street Names, Eastern Universities Press,

External links

Boat Quay: Official website

References 

Tourist attractions in Singapore
Protected areas of Singapore
Roads in Singapore
Downtown Core (Singapore)
Entertainment districts
Restaurant districts and streets in Singapore
Singapore River
Redeveloped ports and waterfronts in Singapore
Wharves